Cymothoe dujardini is a butterfly in the family Nymphalidae. It is found in eastern Madagascar. The habitat consists of forests.

References

Butterflies described in 1971
Cymothoe (butterfly)
Endemic fauna of Madagascar
Butterflies of Africa